Georges Taconet (Mont Saint Aignan, 17 August 1889 – 1962) was a provincial French composer based in Le Havre. He won the local Normandy prize Le prix Gossier in 1926.

Works, editions and recordings
Works
 L'Attente mystique, Triptych to poems by abbé :fr:Louis Le Cardonnel (1862-1936) - orchestral version performed 1927, Le Havre
 Piano Quintet - performed 1932, Paris, favourably reviewed by Paul Le Flem
 Organ Prelude and Fugue - published by Hérelle, reviewed favourably in American Organist 1935
 Over sixty songs
Editions
 Downloadable Editions and Manuscripts
Recordings
 Taconet: Fourteen Songs. Dominique Méa (soprano) and Carlos Cebro (piano). Sonata in D minor for Violin and Piano: Fanny Clamagirand (violin) and Virginie Martineau (piano). Marco Polo 2002-2003, released 2005.

References

External links
Official website

1889 births
1962 deaths
20th-century French composers